Król Dawid (Polish, 'King David') was a galleon of the Polish Navy that fought in the Battle of Oliwa. She was launched as König David 1623 in Danzig (Gdańsk) and initially served as a merchant ship.

During the Polish wars with Sweden, it was drafted into the Polish navy along with Wodnik and Arka Noego. They fought in the Battle of Hel on 17 May 1627. After a short artillery duel the skirmish was over. The following day the escadrille met a convoy of 24 Swedish vessels off the coast of Biała Góra, near Łeba. After a short artillery barrage, the Polish ships managed to evade the enemy and headed for Kolberg (Kołobrzeg). Several days afterwards the escadre managed to break through the Swedish blockade and returned to Wisłoujście, one of two main bases of the Polish Navy.

Under the command of a Scottish captain and shipbuilder Jakub Murray, the ship took part in the victorious battle of Oliwa of 28 November 1627. However, the ship played only a minor role and failed to support Wodnik in her attack on Swedish galleon Solen yet received some damage. After the battle the command was given to Gregor Fentross, who also became the admiral of the Polish fleet. Thus König David became the flagship of the entire Polish Navy. However, during the Swedish assault on Wisłoujście of 6 July 1628, admiral Fentross was killed and the ship received some damage due to artillery fire. All Polish ships were withdrawn up the Vistula river.

In January 1629, the ship was rented by king Sigismund III Vasa to the Habsburg-led Catholic League and served during the Thirty Years' War. Stationed in Wismar, the ship fought against Danish and Swedish fleets at the Baltic Sea and the Northern Sea. In November 1630, however, chased by a Swedish pursuit escadre, König David was forced to seek refuge in Lübeck and was then interned by the locals. Further fate of the ship remains unknown.

References 

Tall ships of Poland
Ships built in Gdańsk
1620s ships